The White Cockatoo is a 1935 American mystery film directed by Alan Crosland and starring Jean Muir, Ricardo Cortez and Ruth Donnelly. It was based on the 1933 novel of the same name by Mignon G. Eberhart. A print is preserved in the Library of Congress collection.

Premise
In a secluded French hotel, a large inheritance is the motivation for threats and kidnappings.

Cast

References

Bibliography
 Monaco, James. The Encyclopedia of Film. Perigee Books, 1991.

External links
 
 

1935 films
1935 mystery films
1930s English-language films
American mystery films
Films directed by Alan Crosland
Films based on American novels
Warner Bros. films
Films set in France
American black-and-white films
1930s American films
Films scored by Bernhard Kaun
Films set in hotels
Films about inheritances